The 1977 FIBA European Championship, commonly called FIBA EuroBasket 1977, was the twentieth FIBA EuroBasket regional basketball championship, held by FIBA Europe.

Venues

Group stage

Group A – Liège

|}

Group B – Ostend

|}

Knockout stage

5th to 8th place

9th to 12th place

Final standings

Awards

Team rosters
1. Yugoslavia: Krešimir Ćosić, Dražen Dalipagić, Mirza Delibašić, Dragan Kićanović, Zoran Slavnić, Žarko Varajić, Željko Jerkov, Vinko Jelovac, Ratko Radovanović, Duje Krstulović, Ante Đogić, Joško Papič (Coach: Aleksandar Nikolić)

2. Soviet Union: Sergei Belov, Anatoly Myshkin, Vladimir Tkachenko, Aleksander Belostenny, Stanislav Eremin, Mikheil Korkia, Valeri Miloserdov, Vladimir Zhigili, Aleksander Salnikov, Viktor Petrakov, Vladimir Arzamaskov, Aleksander Kharchenkov (Coach: Alexander Gomelsky)

3. Czechoslovakia: Kamil Brabenec, Stanislav Kropilak, Zdenek Kos, Jiri Pospisil, Vojtech Petr, Jiri Konopasek, Vlastibor Klimeš, Zdenek Dousa, Gustav Hraska, Josef Necas, Vladimir Ptacek, Pavol Bojanovsky (Coach: Pavel Petera)

4. Italy: Dino Meneghin, Pierluigi Marzorati, Marco Bonamico, Renzo Bariviera, Carlo Caglieris, Lorenzo Carraro, Fabrizio della Fiori, Gianni Bertolotti, Giulio Iellini, Renzo Vecchiato, Vittorio Ferracini, Luigi Serafini (Coach: Giancarlo Primo)

References

1977
Euro
1977 in Belgian sport
1977
September 1977 sports events in Europe
Sport in Liège